Ballingurteen is a village in County Cork, in the southwest of Ireland.  It lies on the R599 road between the towns of Dunmanway and Clonakilty.

References

See also
 List of towns and villages in Ireland

Towns and villages in County Cork